This is a list of films produced by the Tollywood (Telugu language film industry) based in Hyderabad in the year 1984.

Top Grossing films
 Srimadvirat Veerabrahmendra Swami Charitra 
 Bobbili Brahmanna
 Mangamma gari Manavadu
 Bava Maradallu
 challenge

List of released films

Dubbed films

References 

1984
Telugu
Telugu films